Newington may refer to several places:

Places

United Kingdom
 Newington, London, a district of central London, England, and part of the London Borough of Southwark
 Newington, Swale, Kent
 Newington, Folkestone & Hythe, Kent
 Newington, Thanet, Kent
 Newington, Oxfordshire
 Newington, Shropshire, Craven Arms
 Newington, Nottinghamshire
Newington, Belfast, Antrim Road, Northern Ireland
 Newington, Edinburgh, Scotland
 Newington, a ward of Hull City Council

United States
 Newington, Connecticut, a town in Hartford County
 Newington, Georgia, a town in Screven County
 Newington, New Hampshire, a town in Rockingham County
 Newington, Virginia, a census-designated place in Fairfax County

Other countries
 Newington, New South Wales, Australia
 Newington, Victoria, Australia
 Newington, Ontario, South Stormont, eastern Ontario, Canada
 Newington, Mpumalanga, South Africa

Historical sites
 Newington Archaeological Site, King and Queen Courthouse, King and Queen County, Virginia
 Newington Armory, Newington, New South Wales, Royal Australian Navy armament depot
 Newington Plantation, archaeological site near Stallsville, Dorchester County, South Carolina
 Newington House, Silverwater, New South Wales
 Newington Railroad Depot, a railroad station on Bloody Point Road in Newington, New Hampshire

Other places
 Newington Causeway, a road in Southwark, London, between the Elephant and Castle and Borough High Street
 Newington Junction, Newington, Connecticut
 Newington College, Stanmore, New South Wales, Australia
 Newington High School, a public high school located in Newington, Connecticut, on Route 174/Willard Avenue
 Newington Cemetery, one of the several city cemeteries in Edinburgh, Scotland
 Newington Park, a baseball grounds in Baltimore, Maryland
 Newington Gardens, park in Southwark, London, England
 Newington, Walworth (UK Parliament constituency)
 Newington West (UK Parliament constituency)
 Newington (CDOT station)

Other uses
 HMCS Newington, an 1899 Royal Canadian Navy ship, First World War
 P.C.B. Newington (1888–1964), author of a cookery book about Malaysian food
 Newington Rangers F.C., a football club in Northern Ireland
 Newington West by-election

See also
 Newington Green, a district in London
 Newington Bagpath, Gloucestershire
 North Newington, Oxfordshire
 South Newington, Oxfordshire
 Stoke Newington, a district in London
 David Shields House, or Newington, in Edgeworth, Pennsylvania, USA